Suksan Mungpao (born 5 March 1997) is a Thai professional footballer who plays as an attacking midfielder and winger for Thai League 2 club Phrae United.

Suksan Mungpao was a member of the Thailand team that won the 2015 AFF U-19 Youth Championship.

Honours

International
Thailand U-19
 AFF U-19 Youth Championship: 2015

References

1997 births
Living people
Suksan Mungpao
Association football midfielders
Suksan Mungpao
Suksan Mungpao
Suksan Mungpao
Suksan Mungpao
Suksan Mungpao